The 2021 season of the 4. divisjon, the fifth highest association football league for men in Norway.

The league was consolidated: Oslo went from three to two groups, and Indre Østland's two groups were reduced in size.

Teams did not necessarily play each other home and away, because the first matchday was severely delayed due to the COVID-19 pandemic in Norway. In some districts, groups were made smaller to facilitate both home and away matches, whereas in larger groups the teams met only once.

Hordaland, Sogn og Fjordane and Trøndelag split their groups, doubling their respective number of groups, but with no more teams than before.

Sogn og Fjordane's two groups were unique in that every single team advanced to a playoff, where #1 from the two groups faced each other home and away, #2 from the two groups faced each other and so on.

Teams 

Østfold
Sprint-Jeløy − promoted
Råde
Lisleby
Drøbak-Frogn
Østsiden
Kvik Halden 2
Moss 2
Rakkestad
Tistedalen
Ås
Sarpsborg
Borgen
Kråkerøy 2 – relegated
Selbak

Oslo 1
Grei − promoted
Gamle Oslo
Manglerud Star
Nesodden
Oslojuvelene
Ullern 2
Kolbotn
KFUM 2
Oppsal 2
Fagerborg
Follo 2 − relegated
Holmlia
Ready 2 − relegated
Fremad Famagusta − relegated

Oslo 2
Kjelsås 2 – promoted
Heming
Holmen
Årvoll
Bærum 2
Lommedalen
Lyn 2
Rilindja
Christiania
Asker 2
Gui
Majorstuen − relegated
Sagene − relegated
Stabæk 3 − relegated

Akershus
Skjetten – promoted
Eidsvold
Kløfta
Skedsmo
Gjelleråsen 2
Raumnes & Årnes
Strømmen 2
Aurskog-Høland
Lørenskog 2
Eidsvold Turn 2
Gjerdrum
Sørumsand
Blaker – relegated
Fjellhamar – relegated

Indre Østland 1
Lillehammer – promoted
Ham-Kam 2
Kolbukameratene
Gran
Faaberg
Reinsvoll
Valdres – relegated

Indre Østland 2
Engerdal – lost playoff
Ottestad
Elverum 2
Løten
Furnes
Sander
Trysil − relegated

Buskerud
Vestfossen – lost playoff
Modum
Drammens BK
Sande/Berger
Hallingdal
Åskollen
Svelvik
Kongsberg
Huringen
Jevnaker
Konnerud
Stoppen – relegated
Solberg – relegated
Birkebeineren – relegated

Vestfold
Sandefjord 2 – lost playoff
Eik Tønsberg 2
Flint 2 – relegated
Stag/Fram 2
Sandefjord BK
Ørn-Horten 2
Re
Teie
Borre – pulled team after season
Stokke
Larvik Turn
Runar – relegated

Telemark
Urædd – promoted
Stathelle og Omegn
Hei
Odd 3
Notodden 2
Storm
Gulset
Pors 2
Skarphedin
Snøgg
Nome
Langesund – relegated

Agder 1
Søgne – lost playoff
Vigør
Lyngdal
Fløy 2
Kvinesdal
Giv Akt/Mandalskameratene 2 – relegated

Agder 2
Randesund – promoted
Jerv 2
Trauma
Froland
Våg
Hisøy

Rogaland 1
Sandnes Ulf 2 – promoted
Eiger
Varhaug
Sola 2
Rosseland
Ålgård
Klepp
Frøyland
Vardeneset
Vidar 2
Lura
Egersund 2
Nærbø – relegated
Vaulen – relegated

Rogaland 2
Haugesund 2 – promoted
Kopervik
Bryne 2
Djerv 1919 2
Riska
Vard Haugesund 2
Hana
Randaberg
Hundvåg
Skjold
Stavanger
Sunde
Havdur – relegated
Austrått – relegated

Hordaland 1A
Bremnes – promoted
Sund
Åsane 2
Austevoll
Trott
Nordre Fjell – relegated

Hordaland 1B
Bergen Nord – lost playoff
Askøy
Gneist
Tertnes
Fyllingsdalen 2
Smørås – relegated

Hordaland 2A
Lyngbø – lost playoff
Arna-Bjørnar
Voss
NHHI
Os 2
Djerv – relegated

Hordaland 2B
Frøya – promoted
Nordhordland
Loddefjord
Osterøy
Varegg
Mathopen – relegated

Sogn og Fjordane 1 and 2
Eid
Måløy
Studentspretten
Vik
Dale
Syril

Førde
Stryn
Høyang
Jølster
Bremanger
Kaupanger

Sogn og Fjordane after playoffs
Førde – promoted
Eid
Stryn
Måløy
Studentspretten
Høyang
Jølster
Vik
Bremanger
Dale – relegated
Kaupanger – relegated
Syril – relegated

Sunnmøre
Hødd 2 – promoted
Herd
Rollon
Hovdebygda
SIF/Hessa
Bergsøy
Larsnes/Gursken
Langevåg
Emblem
Norborg/Brattvåg 2
Hareid
Valder – relegated

Nordmøre og Romsdal
Tomrefjord – lost playoff
Kristiansund 2
Sunndal
Surnadal
Åndalsnes
Dahle
Malmefjorden
Eide og Omegn
Vestnes Varfjell
Kristiansund FK/Clausenengen
Midsund
Smøla – relegated

Trøndelag 1
Levanger 2 – lost playoff
Verdal
Byåsen 2
Sverresborg
Namsos
Åfjord – relegated

Trøndelag 2
Steinkjer – promoted
Vuku
Rørvik
Charlottenlund
Heimdal/Kattem
Ranheim 3 – relegated

Trøndelag 3
Trygg/Lade – promoted
Nardo 2
NTNUI 2 – relegated
KIL/Hemne
Svorkmo
Fram – relegated

Trøndelag 4
Kvik – lost playoff
Buvik
Stjørdals-Blink 2
Hitra
Orkla 2
Rennebu – relegated

Nordland
Innstranda – promoted
Mosjøen
Grand Bodø
Sandnessjøen
Fauske/Sprint
Junkeren 2/Bodø/Glimt 3 – split after season
Saltdalkameratene – relegated
Rana 2
Røst – relegated
Bossmo & Ytteren

Hålogaland
Harstad – promoted
Sortland
Landsås
Ballstad
Lofoten
Medkila
Andenes
Melbo 2 – relegated
Leknes

Troms
Krokelvdalen – lost playoff
Skarp
Tromsdalen 2
Valhall
Ishavsbyen
Storelva
Salangen
Kvaløya
Bardufoss og Omegn – relegated
Lyngen/Karnes
Stakkevollan – relegated
Finnsnes 2 – relegated

Finnmark
Bossekop – promoted
HIF/Stein
Alta 2
Porsanger
Norild
Kirkenes
Sørøy Glimt
Nordlys
Bjørnevatn – relegated
Rafsbotn – pulled team

Playoffs
Sprint-Jeløy beat Sandefjord 2.
Lillehammer beat Engerdal.
Urædd beat Vestfossen.
Randesund beat Søgne.
Frøya and Bremnes beat Bergen Nord and Lyngbø.
Hødd 2 beat Tomrefjord.
Trygg/Lade and  Steinkjer beat Levanger 2 and Kvik.
Harstad beat Innstranda.
Bossekop beat Krokelvdalen.
Innstranda beat Krokelvdalen.

References
RSSSF

5
Norway
Norway
Norwegian Fourth Division seasons
Norwegian Fourth Division